is a fictional character in the manga and anime series Saiyuki. He is one of the four protagonists, loosely based on (or inspired by) the character Tang Sanzang.

Background
"Konzen Douji" was the first incarnation of Genjo Sanzo. Additionally he wore a god-forged golden coronet, a power limiter, to curb more than just his brute strength. He shows the personality traits of someone who is quick to explode into fits of temper when bothered and also a surprising father-like gentleness and kindness with Goku that no one would have expected.

When "Dr. Ni Jianyi" tell him his father was a government official named Rin Tokou, a political activist who was exiled to Oujyouin in Rishyu, the northern-most town of "Togenkyo". He was 51 years old when he met Sanzo's mother, a woman named "Kouran". She was 17 years of age and the daughter of a shop peddler. After he was conceived, his father went missing and his mother went off into the wilderness to bear the child alone. She died shortly after.

Personality
A very brutal, worldly priest. He drinks, smokes, gambles, and carries a gun, which is pushing it even for normal people (let alone Buddhist monks). He's searching for the stolen Sutra of his mentor and father figure Priest Koumyou Sanzo, who was killed in Sanzo's youth by a mob of murderous Yokai. Sanzo is egotistical, haughty, and can be very cruel, yet our 23-year-old hero also has calm judgment, unwavering intensity, and surprising charisma. His favorite phrases, incidentally, are 'Die,' and 'I'll kill you.' His weapons of choice are the magical Maten Sutra, a handgun, and a paper fan for idiots. He's 177 cm tall (approx. 5'10") and is often noted for his good looks and drooping purple eyes. He is "the 31st of China". He is one of the five highest priests in "Tougenkyo", but he has no intention of devoting himself to Buddhism, and is a corrupt monk who enjoys drinking, smoking, and gambling. Although he has a sharp eye and charisma to see things through, he also has a competitive and selfish side. His favorite phrases are "die" and "I'll kill you".

He is the current holder of the Sanzo title and the wielder of very powerful sutras, though he is usually content to keep those stored away and shoot people immediately. He met his trio of party members through various traumatic adventures and brought them together, offering them a chance to start over. Despite his grouchy exterior, he is revealed to be a good person at heart.

Reception
In 2000, Genjo Sanzo won the Best Male Character award at the 23rd Anime Grand Prix. In August 2001, issue of Newtype Magazine listed their top to anime titles. Gensōmaden Saiyuki was ranked ninth, and Genjo Sanzo, in the top ten male characters, was ranked sixth.

In June 2004, on the 26th Anime Grand Prix Award, Saiyuki Reload was in the top ten Anime titles, It was ranked 4th, Meanwhile Genjo Sanzo was ranked 7th at the top ten Best Male Characters. in 2005, on 27th Anime Grand Prix Award, Genjo Sanzo was the top of twenty best Male Character It was ranked 13th. In 2013, he was ranked 36 on ComicsAlliance's 50 Sexiest Male Characters in Comics list.

On June 11, 2022, "nijimen" anime news site, ranking top 10 popular characters played by Toshihiko Seki, Genjo Sanzo character was ranked 2th. 

On September 10, 2022, "nlab.itmedia" ranking top 30 popular TV anime characters played by voice actor "Toshihiko Seki", The first place is decided by Saiyuki's "Genjo Sanzo" Collected 473 votes from total of 3176 votes.

See also
 List of Saiyuki characters
 Journey to the West
 List of Journey to the West characters

References

External links
Official Studio Pierrot Gensomaden Saiyuki website  
Official Studio Pierrot Gensomaden Saiyuki: Requiem For the One Not Chosen website 
Official Studio Pierrot Saiyuki Reload website  
Official Studio Pierrot Saiyuki Reload Gunlock website  
Official TV Tokyo Gensomaden Saiyuki website 
Official/ "Saiyuki" CD official website 
"World is Mine -mine- website 
 "Saiyuki RELOAD BLAST website 
 "Minekura.net website 

 
Fictional Buddhist monks
Fantasy anime and manga characters
Male characters in anime and manga